La Vallée-du-Richelieu (The Valley of the Richelieu) is a regional county municipality in the Montérégie region in southwestern Quebec, Canada. Its seat is McMasterville.

It surrounds the Richelieu River as the river flows north from Lake Champlain in the United States to the Saint Lawrence River northeast of Montreal at Sorel-Tracy, Quebec. Dramatically different from the mountainous terrain to the south, the river valley is a vast plain that has been developed with extensive farmlands.

In the 21st century, the Richelieu River is very popular for both U.S. and Canadian recreational boaters, providing a connection that can bring boaters all the way from the outlet of the Saint Lawrence River to New York Harbor. A number of old fortifications exist dating back to the 17th century; they were built by the French in an effort to try to prevent the Iroquois from using the river as a way to attack the French settlers in the area. Fort Richelieu is at the mouth of the Richelieu River. Fort St. Louis (now Fort Chambly) at Chambly, Fort Sainte-Thérèse, and Fort Saint-Jean at Saint-Jean-sur-Richelieu, are on the way. Fort St. Anne Isle La Motte, Vermont in Lake Champlain is near the river's source. The region is informally known as la Vallée-des-Forts.

Subdivisions
There are 13 subdivisions within the RCM:

Cities & Towns (6)
 Beloeil
 Carignan
 Chambly
 Mont-Saint-Hilaire
 Otterburn Park
 Saint-Basile-le-Grand

Municipalities (7)
 McMasterville
 Saint-Antoine-sur-Richelieu
 Saint-Charles-sur-Richelieu
 Saint-Denis-sur-Richelieu
 Saint-Jean-Baptiste
 Saint-Marc-sur-Richelieu
 Saint-Mathieu-de-Beloeil

Demographics

Population

Language

Transportation

Access Routes
Highways and numbered routes that run through the municipality, including external routes that start or finish at the county border:

 Autoroutes
 
 
 
 

 Principal Highways
 
 
 
 

 Secondary Highways
 
 
 

 External Routes
 None

See also
 List of regional county municipalities and equivalent territories in Quebec

References

External links 
 Fort Richelieu official site

 
Census divisions of Quebec